Langlands is a traditional English surname stemming from Middle English. It refers to the land holdings of the original person so named, and literally means “long (or vast) lands”. It may refer to:

People
Alex Langlands, British archaeologist and historian
 Alan Langlands, vice chancellor of the University of Leeds
 Anders Langlands, visual effects supervisor
 Geoffrey Langlands (1917–2019), British army officer and educator
 George Langlands (1886–1951), Scottish footballer
 Graeme Langlands (1941–2018), Australian rugby player and coach
 Langlands and Bell, English artists
 Robert Langlands (born 1936), Canadian mathematician
 Langlands classification
 Langlands decomposition
 Langlands dual
 Langlands group
 Langlands program

Other uses

 Langlands, Queensland, a locality in the Western Downs Region, Queensland, Australia

 Langlands Park, a rugby league park in Brisbane, Queensland, Australia
 Langlands (villa), a building in Kinnoull, Scotland